2015 Auckland Open was a darts tournament that took place in Auckland, New Zealand on 19 September 2015.

Results

Men

Women

References

2015 in darts
2015 in New Zealand sport
Darts in New Zealand
September 2015 sports events in New Zealand